This is a list of members of the Australian Senate from 1 July 1981 to 5 February 1983. Half of the state senators were elected at the December 1977 election and had terms due to finish on 30 June 1984; the other half of the state senators were elected at the October 1980 election and had terms due to finish on 30 June 1987. The territory senators were elected at the October 1980 election and their terms ended at the dissolution of the House of Representatives, which was March 1983. However, in fact, the Senate was dissolved on 4 February 1983 for a double dissolution election.

Notes

References

Members of Australian parliaments by term
20th-century Australian politicians
Australian Senate lists